The Third Floor, Inc.: a visual effects company.
 The 3rd Floor: a 3-part webisode of the US version of "The Office"